Vixen! is a 1968 American drama film and satiric softcore sexploitation film directed by Russ Meyer and starring Erica Gavin. It was the first film to be given an X rating for its sex scenes, and was a breakthrough success for Meyer. The film was developed from a script by Meyer and Anthony James Ryan.

The film concerns the adventures of the oversexed Vixen (Gavin), as she sexually manipulates everyone she meets. The story's taboo-violations mount quickly, including themes of incest and racism.

Plot 
At a Canadian wilderness resort, sultry and sexually assertive Vixen Palmer lives happily married with her husband Tom, a bush pilot and owner of a tourist lodge. The hypersexual Vixen nevertheless seduces anyone within reach including a Mountie, a couple her husband brings home as clients - the husband first, his wife later, and eventually her own brother, Judd. The only person she will not have sex with is Judd's friend Niles, an African American Vietnam war deserter, who Vixen verbally abuses with racist insults.

A wealthy Irish tourist (who is really a Marxist Irish Republican Army sympathizer) entices the couple to fly him and - against Vixen's protestations - Niles to the United States. In the air, he attempts to hijack the small Cessna 177 Cardinal to Cuba, taking Vixen and her pilot husband as hostages. Niles is reluctant to take sides, but after some altercations, Tom and Niles overwhelm the perpetrator. In return for his support, Tom helps Niles escape the US customs; as they are parting, Niles and Vixen conciliate.

At the end of the film, her husband takes on another couple and Vixen smiles in a sinister and disturbing way, apparently planning to seduce them. The final slide reads "The End?".

Production 
Erica Gavin was a dancer in clubs who knew women who had acted in other Meyer films. She answered an advertisement seeking actors for Vixen and was cast.

Meyer recalled, "Bravely I went up to the location for Vixen without a leading lady and left a couple of my henchmen to try to find somebody. It's always difficult. But Erica had a curious quality about her. She didn't have the greatest body, you know. She didn't have the up-thrust breasts like the others. "

The film was shot in Miranda, California. Many of the opening scenes were filmed in Victoria, BC, Canada

During the film, assistant director George Costello had a relationship with Gavin, which led to the end of Costello's professional relationship with Meyer. Erica Gavin, on the other hand, went on to shoot one more movie with Meyer.

Meyer said the sex scene between Gavin and her brother "was the best of them all. She [Erica Gavin] really displayed an animal quality that I've never been able to achieve before – the way she grunted and hung in there and did her lines. It was a really remarkable job... I've done a lot of jokey screwing but there's something about Erica and her brother that was just remarkable... [it] really represents the way I like to screw."

Reception 
The film was a huge box office success. Meyer later attributed this to the fact "it was so frank for its time. And a lot of it had to be attributed to Erica Gavin. She had a quality that also appealed to women. And women came in great numbers."

Meyer later elaborated:
I think an awful lot of women would have liked to have been able to act like Vixen a few times in their lives. To have an afternoon in which they could have laid three guys, have an affair with their best girl friend, that would straighten a lot of people out... Everything she [Vixen] touched was improved. She didn't destroy, she helped. If there was a marriage that was kind of dying on the vine, she injected something into it which made it better... I think that every man at one time or another would thoroughly enjoy running into an aggressive female like Vixen...  She was like a switch-hitter. You show this girl as being like a utility outfielder: she could cover all the positions.
Meyer said he used sex in the film to make points about racial bigotry and communism.

Critical reception 
The Los Angeles Times called the film "good clean fun for adults... may well be Meyer's best film to date".

The New York Times called it "slick, lascivious."

Roger Ebert called it "the quintessential Russ Meyer film... Meyer's ability to keep his movies light and farcical took the edge off the sex for people seeing their first skin-flick. By the time he made vixen, Meyer had developed a directing style so open, direct and good-humored that it dominated his material. He was willing to use dialogue so ridiculous...  situations so obviously tongue-in-cheek, characters so incredibly stereotyped and larger than life, that even his most torrid scenes usually managed to get outside themselves. Vixen was not only a good skin-flick, but a merciless satire on the whole genre."

See also 
List of American films of 1968

References

External links 
 
 

1968 films
1968 independent films
American aviation films
American independent films
American satirical films
American sexploitation films
1960s English-language films
Films directed by Russ Meyer
Films set in British Columbia
Films shot in California
Incest in film
Films with screenplays by Russ Meyer
Female bisexuality in film
1960s American films